The European Academy of Sciences and Arts (EASA) is a transnational and interdisciplinary network, connecting about 2,000 recommended scientists and artists worldwide, including 37 Nobel Prize laureates. The European Academy of Sciences and Arts  is a learned society of scientists and artists, founded by Felix Unger. The academy was founded 1990, is situated in Salzburg and has been supported by the city of Vienna, the government of Austria, and the European Commission.
The EASA is now headed by President Klaus Mainzer, TUM Emeritus of Excellence at the Technical University of Munich and Senior Professor at the Carl Friedrich von Weizsäcker Center of the University of Tübingen.

It is unrelated to and should not be confused with a different, highly controversial, and less well-established academy, the Belgium-based European Academy of Sciences.

It is a member of the InterAcademy Partnership. Its activities have included a collaboration with the Latvian Academy of Sciences: the European-Latvian Institute for Cultural and Scientific Exchange (EUROLAT), founded in 1993.

History 
The origins date back to a scientific working group with the Salzburg cardiac surgeon Felix Unger, the Archbishop from Vienna Franz König and the political scientist and philosopher Nikolaus Lobkowicz. On 7 March 1990, the academy was officially founded in Salzburg, where the academy is still located until today. 
 
The Festive Plenary of the European Academy of Sciences and Arts takes place annually with the festive admission of new members in Salzburg. On the occasion of the 25th- and 30th- anniversary the celebrations took place with the Federal Presidents of Austria and other Presidents of European countries. Other Protectors (national patrons) of the academy are King Philippe of Belgium, Borut Pahor (State President of Slovenia), Gjorge Ivanov (State President of Macedonia) and since 12 June 2018 Austrian Federal President Alexander Van der Bellen. Past Protektors are i. a. the former EU Commission President and Prime Minister of Luxembourg Jacques Santer, the former King of Spain Juan Carlos I and the former EU Commission President and Italian Prime Minister Romano Prodi.

Vision and membership 
The European Academy of Sciences and Arts is politically independent and financed by donations, private sponsors and public institutions. The activities of the academy do not aim at financial profit. The academy is a forum of scholars who take up interdisciplinarily and trannsdisciplinarily scientific topics with societal impact. In 2020, the academy had round about 2000 members worldwide, including 34 Nobel Prize Laureates. These are respected and recommended scientists and artists, among them 37 nobel prize laureats. The membership can be awarded following suggestions of their members. The Senate decides on admission on the basis of recommendations of the nomination commission. The membership is considered as distinction of the merits in science and society.
Famous members of the academy are i. a. the economist Hans-Werner Sinn, Michail Gorbatschow (Nobel Peace Prize), the artist Jenny Holzer and Pope em. Benedict XVI. 
Current members who are Nobel Prize Laureates are as follows.
Zhores I. Alferov, Physics 2000
Werner Arber, Medicine 1978 
Gerd Binnig, Physics 1986
Aaron Ciechanover, Chemistry 2004
Paul J. Crutzen, Chemistry 1995
François Englert, Physics 2013
Gerhard Ertl, Chemistry 2007
Andre Geim, Physics 2010
Mikhail Gorbachev, Peace 1990
Peter Grünberg, Physics 2007
Theodor W. Hänsch, Physics 2005
Peter Higgs, Physics 2013
Jules A. Hoffmann, Medicine 2011
Harald zur Hausen, Medicine 2008
Robert Huber, Chemistry 1988
Tim Hunt, Physiology or Medicine 2001
Eric Kandel, Physiology or Medicine 2000
Wolfgang Ketterle, Physics 2001
Bernard Lown, Peace 1985
Luc Montagnier, Medicine 2008
May-Britt Moser, Physiology or Medicine 2014
Erwin Neher, Medicine 1991
Konstantin Novoselov, Physics 2010
Ryōji Noyori, Chemistry 2001
Sir Paul Nurse, Medicine 2001
Edmund S. Phelps, Economics 2006
John C. Polanyi, Chemistry 1986
Brian P. Schmidt, Physics 2011
Dan Shechtman, Chemistry 2011
Joseph E. Stiglitz, Economics 2002
Fraser Stoddart, Chemistry 2016
Thomas Südhof, Physiology or Medicine 2013
Torsten N. Wiesel, Medicine 1981
Kurt Wüthrich, Chemistry 2002
Klaus Hasselmann, Physics 2021
Emmanuelle Charpentier, Chemistry 2020
Anton Zeilinger, Physics 2022

Organisation 
The academy is a non-profit association according to the Austrian Association. The current President of the academy is Klaus Mainzer who in 2020 followed the Founding President Felix Unger. The Vice presidents are Birgit Harreß, Wolfango Plastino, and Ursula Schmidt-Erfurth.

Members of the academy come from 73 countries and are divided into eight classes:

Class I: Humanities – Dean: Andreas Önnerfors
Class II: Medicine – Dean: Dusan Suput
Class III: Arts – Dean: Violeta Dinescu
Class IV: Natural Sciences – Dean: Ioannis Liritzis
Class V: Social Sciences, Law, and Economics – Dean: Kurt Schmoller
Class VI: Technology and Environmental Sciences – Dean: Sergio Orlandi
Class VII: World Religions – Dean: Mariano Delgado

Prize of Tolerance 
Since 1997 the European Academy of Sciences and Arts has awarded the Prize of Tolerance to acknowledge the engagement for humanity and tolerance. Guided by the targets of the Charter of Tolerance, this prize is awarded to persons or institutions which actively engage for tolerance and humanness, but also for cross-border dialogue and against racism.

The previous award winners are:

 1997 Teddy Kollek
 1998 Suzanne Mubarak
 1999 Franz Kardinal König
 2000 Astrid N. Heiberg
 2002 Dorothea Rosenblad
 2003 Djibrail Kassab
 2004 Daniel Barenboim
 2005 Giandomenico Picco
 2006 Hans-Dietrich Genscher
 2007 Flavio Cotti
 2008 Eugen Biser
 2009 Klaus Töpfer
 2010 Karl Kardinal Lehmann
 2011 Daniel Barenboim
 2013 Pedro Opeka
 2015 Internationales Olympisches Komitee
 2016 Roland Riz
 2018 Marko Feingold
 2019 Hans Peter Haselsteiner

Rings of Tolerance 

Prize award of the Rings of Tolerance in the City Hall of Cologne 
Since 2012, the academy annually awards the Rings of Tolerance to members of the three religions of Abraham according to Lessing's Parable of the Ring, in ordert to support justice and tolerance between Christianity, Judaism, and Islam.

The previous award winners are:

 2012 Lord George Weidenfeld, Karl Cardinal Lehmann and Zaki Anwar Nusseibeh
 2013 Evelyn de Rothschild, Friede Springer and Nemir Kirdar
 2014 André Azoulay (Adviser of King Mohammed VI of Morocco), Hubert Burda and Prince Hassan of Jordan
 2015 Xavier Guerrand-Hermès, Farah Pandith, Baron Harry Woolf
 2016 Péter Cardinal Erdő, Uri Lubrani, Ismail Serageldin
 2017 Avishay Braverman, Rabeya Müller, Mitri Raheb
 2018 Katajun Amirpur, Esther Bejarano, Doris Leuthard
 2019 Mouhanad Khorchide, Jan und Aleida Assmann
2021 Walter Homolka,Andrea Riccardi,Edmond Brahimaj

Fellows 
Following are some fellows of European Academy of Sciences and Arts:
Giorgio Benedek
Xin Shi

References

External links

 
Educational institutions established in 1990
Educational organizations based in Europe
International academies
Scientific organizations established in 1990
1990 establishments in Europe